Raushan Koishibayeva (born 7 March 1966) is a Kazakhstani Paralympic powerlifter. She won a silver medal in the 67 kg category at the 2016 Summer Paralympics, aged 50.

Koishibayeva is married and has three children. Both of her legs were amputated in 1990 due to an injury. She took up powerlifting in 2010.

References 

1966 births
Living people
Powerlifters at the 2016 Summer Paralympics
Medalists at the 2016 Summer Paralympics
Paralympic silver medalists for Kazakhstan
Female powerlifters
Kazakhstani powerlifters
Paralympic medalists in powerlifting
Powerlifters at the 2020 Summer Paralympics
21st-century Kazakhstani women